Barke is a Tulu film directed by Bharath Krishna and produced by Suresh Reddy. It stars Ashwin Shetty, Srikanth, Balachandra, Nagaraj, and Riya Meghana in the lead roles. Krishna also wrote the screenplay for the movie. The film is based on a true story.

References

2014 films
Tulu-language films